The Jazz Message of Hank Mobley is an album by jazz saxophonist Hank Mobley released on the Savoy label in 1956. It was recorded on February 8, 1956 and features performances by Mobley, Donald Byrd, Ronnie Ball, Horace Silver, Doug Watkins, Wendell Marshall, John LaPorta and Kenny Clarke. It was not issued as a Hank Mobley leader album until the CD era.

Track listing 
All compositions by Hank Mobley except as indicated.
 "There Will Never Be Another You" (Gordon, Warren) - 5:51
 "Cattin'" - 4:38
 "Madeline" - 4:42
 "When I Fall in Love" (Heyman, Young) - 3:47
 "Budo" (Davis, Powell) - 7:32
 "I Married an Angel" (Hart, Rodgers) - 7:00 
 "The Jazz Message (Freedom for All)" (Cadena) - 8:00

Recorded on January 30 (tracks 5-7) & February 8 (tracks 1-4), 1956.

Personnel 
 Hank Mobley - tenor saxophone (1-3)
 John LaPorta - alto saxophone (5-7)
 Donald Byrd - trumpet except track 3
 Ronnie Ball (1-4), Horace Silver (5-7) - piano 
 Doug Watkins (1-4), Wendell Marshall (5-7) - bass
 Kenny Clarke - drums

References

Hard bop albums
Hank Mobley albums
1956 albums
Savoy Records albums
Albums recorded at Van Gelder Studio